Dear Heart is a 1964 American movie.

Dear Heart may also refer to:
"Dear Heart" (song), the theme from the movie, sung by Andy Williams
Andy Williams' Dear Heart, a 1965 album containing the song
Dear Heart, a 1981 Filipino movie directed by Danny Zialcita starring Gabby Concepcion and Sharon Cuneta
Dear Heart, a 1980s UK television show with performers including Leni Harper and Toyah Willcox and writers including Victoria Pile

See also
"Dearheart", a track from the soundtrack of 2011 movie All God's Creatures
Adora Belle Dearheart, a character in Terry Pratchett's Discworld series
"Dear Heart! What a Terrible Life I Am Led", a song performed in 1769 by Lewis Hallam Jr. 
"Dear Hearts and Gentle People", a 1949 song
Dear Friends and Gentle Hearts, a 2009 American Steel album
Dear Lonely Hearts, a 1962 Nat King Cole album
Dark Dear Heart, a 1997 Holly Cole album and its title track
"Good Night, Dear Heart", a Quantum Leap episode
Rejoice, Dear Hearts!, a 1959 comedy album by Brother Dave Gardner 
So Dear to My Heart, a 1948 Disney film